Younes Ahmed (Arabic:يونس أحمد) (born 26 June 1991) is an Emirati footballer who plays as a winger .

External links

References

Emirati footballers
1991 births
Living people
Al-Nasr SC (Dubai) players
Hatta Club players
Place of birth missing (living people)
UAE Pro League players
Ras Al Khaimah Club players
Khor Fakkan Sports Club players
UAE First Division League players
Association football wingers